Typhoon Texas is a series of water parks in Texas. The company currently operates two locations in Austin and in Katy.

Typhoon Texas Houston
Typhoon Texas Houston is a 25 acre water park was located  next to Katy Mills in Katy, Texas. Construction began in 2015 and the park opened Memorial Day Weekend in 2016.

Typhoon Texas Austin
Typhoon Texas Austin is located in Pflugerville, Texas. The park was part of the Hawaiian Falls water park chain from 2014-2016. The Park covers 25 acres of land, a majority of which is parking lots, and includes zip lines and rope courses (although these have been closed for years). On December 15, 2016, it was announced that Typhoon Texas, a water park located in Katy, Texas (near Houston), would take over ownership of the park.

References 

Water parks in Texas